Oskar Gustav Rudolf Hergt (22 October 1869, in Naumburg – 9 May 1967, in Göttingen)  was a German nationalist politician, who served simultaneously as the minister of Justice and vice-chancellor from 28 January 1927 to 12 June 1928. Hergt attended the prestigious Domgymnasium Naumburg before studying law at Würzburg, Munich and Berlin. He worked as a Gerichtsassessor in Saxony, and as a judge in Liebenwerda. Hergt held  various senior offices at the Prussian Ministry of Finance from 1904 to 1914. Previously a member of the FKP, which was dissolved after the First World War, Hergt was a founding member of the right-wing monarchist DNVP and the party's first chairman. First elected to the Reichstag in 1920, he was seen as one of the more moderate members of the party. His support for the Dawes Plan in 1924 was seen as a betrayal of the party's line and led to his replacement with the more hardline conservative Kuno von Westarp. As vice-chancellor, Hergt was the most senior DNVP politician in Wilhelm Marx's coalition government, but after losing the DNVP's leadership election in October 1928 to Alfred Hugenberg, he became an increasingly minor figure in the radicalised DNVP. After the rise of the Nazi Party, Hergt retired from politics.

References

External links
 

1869 births
1967 deaths
People from Naumburg (Saale)
People from the Province of Saxony
German Protestants
German National People's Party politicians
Vice-Chancellors of Germany
Government ministers of Germany
Members of the Reichstag of the Weimar Republic
Finance ministers of Prussia